Mathey College is one of six residential colleges at Princeton University.  Located in the Northwest corner of the Princeton Campus, its dormitories and other buildings are predominantly in the Collegiate Gothic style.  Since the fall of 2007, Mathey has been a four-year residential college, paired with the two-year Rockefeller College.  This means that Princeton undergraduates who wish to remain in a residential college past their sophomore year may live in Mathey during their junior and/or senior years.  Because Mathey is paired with Rockefeller, upperclassmen who spent their first two years in Mathey or Rockefeller are given priority for housing in Mathey.

Most of Mathey College is centered on a large central courtyard featuring a sand volleyball court. Campbell Hall, Joline Hall, Blair Hall, Hamilton Hall (with the dining hall and common room), Edwards Hall, and some of Little Hall (since fall 2007) make up the residential college.  Hamilton Hall, Little Hall, and Edwards Hall are not on the main courtyard, though they are near to it.

Mathey College is famous for Blair Arch, featured prominently in the movie A Beautiful Mind. As the largest arch at Princeton, Blair Arch hosts many arch sings, a capella concerts held in the arch.

Mathey College is named after Dean Mathey of the Class of 1912, who was a prominent member of the Princeton community.

The current dean is Dr. Michael Olin, and the current Head of the College, as of the fall of 2018, is Professor Stacey Sinclair of the Psychology Department.

External links

Colleges of Princeton University
1982 establishments in New Jersey